Cao Tân is a rural commune (xã) of Pác Nặm District, Bắc Kạn Province, in Vietnam.

Populated places in Bắc Kạn province
Communes of Bắc Kạn province